is the 5th installment of The Ring manga series, based on the Japanese film of the same name. The antagonist of previous films & manga, Sadako Yamamura, is now the protagonist, it explores the origin of the cursed video, her early life, and the development of her powers. Both the film and manga are loosely based on the Ring novel series by Koji Suzuki.

Introduction
The events in The Ring Volume 0: Birthday take place 30 years prior to the events in previous manga installments and films. The antagonist, Sadako Yamamura, has been put into the role of protagonist and her background is explored. The manga opens in Tokyo with two women having a conversation over their phones about a dream related to a video. In the dream the woman having a conversation is seen exploring the premise of an abandoned house. As she explores the house further she finds a well and an opening in the house, she goes through the opening and up a pair of stairs. Next follows a scene where a woman is knocked into the well, this foreshadows the end of the book where Sadako is pushed into the well by her father.

Plot summary
Journalist Miyaji Akiko begins conducting an investigation into the girl known as Sadako, due to the belief that her fiancé was killed by Sadako. Her search takes her to a Tokyo theatre troupe, to which Sadako belongs, as an outcast. During rehearsals, the lead actress, Aiko, is mysteriously struck down dead. Subsequently, and to the disapproval of the troupe, the director, Shigemori, bequeaths the lead role to Sadako. Toyama, the sound-man, is the sole member of the troupe who supports Sadako. During another rehearsal session, Toyama hears strange noises coming from the sound tapes. He and another member, Etsuko, deduce that the sound appears at the part in rehearsals during which Aiko died. Not only that, but Aiko's voice can be heard on the tape. Meanwhile, at Sadako's apartment, Shigemori has shown up and promises he will help her become a top-notch actress. His motives, however, are clearly impure.

Back at the theatre, Etsuko discovers Sadako's costume is missing. She and Toyama find Sadako backstage, in a dreamlike state, clutching the dress. Etsuko takes the dress and leaves, enraged. Sadako tells Toyama that she feels that someone is with her, always following her. She collapses, and wakes at Toyama's house. However, she has another bloody vision, and runs off. Miyaji turns up at the theatre, asking to see Sadako, claiming reasons of journalism. While she is taking photographs, the camera violently breaks. Afterwards, Miyaji receives a visit from Sadako's childhood teacher, who claims that she witnessed strange and horrifying things in the Yamamura Inn in Sadako's hometown. She also reports claims of a second Sadako.

The night before the play's premier, Shigemori turns on Sadako, deducing that she killed the reporters at her mother, Shizuko's, public psychic experiment. He attacks her, only to be attacked and accidentally killed by Toyama. The two hide the body, and Toyama is taken to the hospital. There, Sadako is revealed to possess healing abilities. That night, at the play's premier, Sadako and Toyama confess their love for each other. Etsuko and Miyaji have joined forces, and hatch a plan to get their revenge on Sadako; Miyaji for the death of her fiancé, and Etsuko for stealing the affections of Toyama. During the play, Etsuko plays a recording of Shizuko's experiment. The sound causes Sadako to freeze. Shizuko's ghost appears onstage, and Sadako's doctor climbs onstage to help her. Sadako sees him as Shigemori, and psychically sets him alight. Backstage, the other troupe members have found Shigemori's corpse, and chase Sadako into a dressing room, where they brutally club her to death. Miyaji deduces that she and the troupe have been cursed simply by their contact with Sadako, and that the curse will only lift if they kill the second Sadako as well.

With Sadako's body in a truck, they drive to Dr. Ikuma Heihachiro, Sadako's foster father's, house. He appears to have been expecting them. Being aware of their motives, he leads them to the second Sadako's bedroom. She has, however, escaped. Back in the truck, Sadako has revived due to her proximity to her other self. Together with Toyama, she escapes to a nearby clifftop. Merging with her other, malicious self, she kills first Toyama, and then the rest of the troupe. Miyaji and Etsuko hide out in a nearby hut. When Sadako discovers them, Miyaji shoots Etsuko and herself, rather than face the death that Sadako brings.

Dr. Heihachiro finds Sadako some time later, herself again. He takes her to the house, and gives her an injection, claiming it will calm her, but the substance that he gave her was a poison. He intends to kill her himself. Sadako attempts to run away, but struggles with movement. She makes it as far as the well in Heihachiro's yard. Heihachiro savagely slashes at her with a knife, and drops her in the well, sealing her away forever. Down in the well, Sadako wakes and screams, realizing her fate. Some time later, the lines that Sadako rehearsed in the play run through her head as she mentally creates the cursed video.

References

External links
Dark Horse Comics
Review of the film adaptation
 

2005 manga
The Ring (franchise)
Dark Horse Comics titles